is a Japanese bank founded in Saitama Prefecture 1943. After a series of bank mergers and corporate restructuring, the  emerged as the leading bank in Saitama Prefecture.

History
The head office of Saitama Bank was located in Urawa, Saitama with more than 170 branches in Japan. Overseas branches included Singapore, London, New York, Hong Kong and Brussels.

In 1990, the bank's financial instability was revealed. Its directors were alleged to have mismanaged corporate assets and breached fiduciary duties by purchasing a large block of stock in a Japanese manufacturing company at what were grossly inflated prices.

In 1991, Kyowa Bank and Saitama Bank merged to form one of the world's largest banks with deposits totaling about $177 billion. This was construed as triggering reorganization of Japan's banking industry.  In 1992, the combined banks were renamed Asahi Bank; and this bank merged with Daiwa Bank in 2002.

In 2002, corporate restructuring established Resona Holdings and the Saitama Resona Bank.

See also

 List of banks in Japan
 Dai-Ichi Kangyo Bank
 Kiyoshi IzawaGM,CBD

Notes

References
 Nussbaum, Louis-Frédéric and Käthe Roth. (2005).  Japan encyclopedia. Cambridge: Harvard University Press. ;  OCLC 58053128

External links 
Resona Holdings, Inc.
   Wang v. Saitama Bank, United States Court of Appeals for the Ninth Circuit, July 25, 1991;  940 F2d 670
 New York State Banking Department,  Saitama Bank, Ltd.
  AGS Corporation

Regional banks of Japan